Colonial Forge High School is a public high school in Stafford, Virginia serving students in grades nine through twelve in the central portion of Stafford County, Virginia.

Location and demographics

Colonial Forge is located on Courthouse Road, State Route 630,  slightly over two miles from Interstate 95 and U.S. Route 1. Colonial Forge's student enrollment is now 55.0% Caucasian, 26.0% African American, 14.8% Hispanic, and 5.5% Asian/Pacific Islander.

History

Colonial Forge was completed in 1999 as the fourth high school to open in Stafford County. The school's colors are navy blue, forest green, and silver and the mascot is the Bald Eagle.

A historical marker denoting the Accokeek Furnace Archeological Site is located on the school grounds.

Academics and extracurricular activities

Molten Art, Colonial Forge's literary magazine, has won several Crown Awards in Columbia University's CSPA Crown competition, including a Silver Crown in 2004, and Gold Crowns in 2006 and 2008. Molten Art consistently earns high national praise, often competing against private schools that specialize in the arts.

Athletics
Colonial Forge's athletic teams compete in the AAA Northwest Region.

The Colonial Forge wrestling team has claimed four AAA VA State Championships in wrestling back-to-back-to-back in 2007-08-09, and again in 2012. They also won a 6A State Title in 2015, 2016, and 2017.

In 2014, the Colonial Forge boys' basketball team became the first high school basketball team from Stafford County to win the State Championship.  They repeated as state champions in 2015.

In 2017, the Colonial Forge girls' basketball team became the first high school basketball team from Stafford County to win the VHSL 6A Women's Tournament. They beat the Oakton Cougars by a score of 52-38 in the title game held on March, 11.

References

Stafford County Public Schools
Public high schools in Virginia
Educational institutions established in 1999
1999 establishments in Virginia